Levantina guttata is a species of air-breathing land snail, a terrestrial pulmonate gastropod mollusk in the family Helicidae, the typical snails.

Distribution 
This species occurs in Turkey.

References

Helicidae
Gastropods described in 1804
Endemic fauna of Turkey